Mr. Bojangles is an album by saxophonist Sonny Stitt recorded in 1973 and released on the Cadet label.

Reception

Allmusic awarded the album 3½ stars stating "Mr. Bojangles pairs Sonny Stitt with arranger Don Sebesky for one of the smoothest and most mainstream-facing dates of the saxophonist's career. Sebesky's luminous treatments underscore the elegance of Stitt's soulful alto and tenor leads".

Track listing 
 "Mr. Bojangles" (Jerry Jeff Walker) - 7:31     
 "World Is a Ghetto" (Papa Dee Allen, Harold Brown, B.B. Dickerson, Lonnie Jordan, Charles Miller, Lee Oskar, Howard E. Scott) - 6:56     
 "Killing Me Softly With His Song" (Charles Fox, Norman Gimbel) - 4:41     
 "Blue Monsoon"  (Esmond Edwards) - 5:06     
 "Got to Be There" (Elliot Willensky) - 3:33     
 "Fifty Per Cent"  (Sonny Stitt) - 3:38     
 "Ben" (Donald Black, Walter Scharf) - 4:56

Personnel 
Sonny Stitt - alto saxophone, tenor saxophone
Roland Hanna - electric piano
Cornell Dupree - guitar
Richard Davis - electric bass
Jimmy Johnson - drums 
George Marge - alto flute, oboe
Jimmy Buffington - French Horn
Gloria Agostini - harp
Phil Kraus - vibraphone, xylophone, percussion
Warren Smith - percussion
David Nadien, Harold Kobain, Emmanuel Green, Gene Orloff, Paul Gershman, Harry Lookofsky, Joseph Malia - violin
Charles McCracken, George Ricci cello
Don Sebesky - arranger, conductor

References 

1973 albums
Cadet Records albums
Sonny Stitt albums
Albums produced by Esmond Edwards
Albums arranged by Don Sebesky